Acetoacetic acid (IUPAC name: 3-Oxobutanoic acid, also known as Acetonecarboxylic acid, Acetyl acetate or Diacetic acid) is the organic compound with the formula CH3COCH2COOH. It is the simplest beta-keto acid, and like other members of this class, it is unstable.  The methyl and ethyl esters, which are quite stable, are produced on a large scale industrially as precursors to dyes. Acetoacetic acid is a weak acid.

Biochemistry
Under typical physiological conditions, acetoacetic acid exists as its conjugate base, acetoacetate.

Acetoacetate is produced in the mitochondria of the liver from acetoacetyl coenzyme A (CoA). First, another acetyl group is added from acetyl CoA to form 3-hydroxy-3-methylglutaryl CoA, then an acetyl CoA is lost from this, yielding acetoacetate. The initial acetoacetate can come from the last cycle in the beta oxidation of a fatty acid, or it can be synthesized from two acetyl CoA molecules, catalyzed by thiolase.

In mammals, acetoacetate produced in the liver (along with the other two "ketone bodies") is released into the bloodstream as an energy source during periods of fasting, exercise, or as a result of type 1 diabetes mellitus. First, a CoA group is enzymatically transferred to it from succinyl CoA, converting it back to acetoacetyl CoA; this is then broken into two acetyl CoA molecules by thiolase, and these then enter the citric acid cycle. Heart muscle and renal cortex prefer acetoacetate over glucose. The brain uses acetoacetate when glucose levels are low due to fasting or diabetes.

Synthesis and properties 
Acetoacetic acid may be prepared by the hydrolysis of diketene. Its esters are produced analogously via the reaction between diketene and alcohols, and acetoacetic acid can be prepared by the hydrolysis of these species.
In general, acetoacetic acid is generated at 0 °C and used in situ immediately.  It decomposes at a moderate rate to acetone and carbon dioxide:
CH3C(O)CH2CO2H  →  CH3C(O)CH3  +  CO2
The acid form has a half-life of 140 minutes at 37 °C in water, whereas the basic form (the anion) has a half-life of 130 hours. That is, it reacts about 55 times more slowly.
It is a weak acid (like most alkyl carboxylic acids), with a pKa of 3.58.

Acetoacetic acid displays keto-enol tautomerisation, with the enol form being partially stabilised by extended conjugation and intramolecular H-bonding. The equilibrium is strongly solvent depended; with the keto form dominating in polar solvents (98% in water) and the enol form accounting for 25-49% of material in non-polar solvents.

Applications

Acetoacetic esters are used for the acetoacetylation reaction, which is widely used in the production of arylide yellows and diarylide dyes.  Although the esters can be used in this reaction, diketene also reacts with alcohols and amines to the corresponding acetoacetic acid derivatives in a process called acetoacetylation. An example is the reaction with 4-aminoindane:

Detection 
Acetoacetic acid is measured in the urine of people with diabetes to test for ketoacidosis and for monitoring people on a ketogenic or low-carbohydrate diet. This is done using dipsticks coated in nitroprusside or similar reagents. Nitroprusside changes from pink to purple in the presence of acetoacetate, the conjugate base of acetoacetic acid, and the colour change is graded by eye. The test does not measure β-hydroxybutyrate, the most abundant ketone in the body; during treatment of ketoacidosis β-hydroxybutyrate is converted to acetoacetate so the test is not useful after treatment begins and may be falsely low at diagnosis.

Similar tests are used in dairy cows to test for ketosis.

See also
 3-Hydroxybutyrate dehydrogenase

References

Histone deacetylase inhibitors
Beta-keto acids